This is a list of number-one country albums in the United States by year from the Billboard Top Country Albums chart.

1960s

1970s

1980s

1990s

2000s

2010s

2020s